Jitendra Prasada (12 November 1938 – 16 January 2001) was an Indian politician and a former vice-president of the Indian National Congress. He was also the political advisor to two prime ministers of India, Rajiv Gandhi in 1991 and P. V. Narasimha Rao in 1994.

Prasad fought Congress Party's presidential election against Sonia Gandhi on 9 November 2000 but he was defeated. He died on 16 January 2001 in New Delhi following a cerebral haemorrhage.

Personal life 
Jitendra Prasada was born to Kunwar Jyoti Prasada and Pamela Devi at Shahjahanpur on 12 November 1938. His grandmother Purnima Devi was the niece of Rabindranath Tagore and mother Pamela Devi belonged to the royal family of Kapurthala State.

He was educated at Sam Higginbottom Institute of Agriculture, Technology and Sciences. Other institutes include Sherwood College, Nainital, Colvin Taluqdars College, Lucknow. He married Kanta Prasada on 27 January 1973. This couple have a son, Jitin Prasada and a daughter, Jahnavi Prasada. The family of Jitendra Prasada resides at Prasad Bhawan, Shahjahanpur.

Political career 
Prasad entered politics as a member of Uttar Pradesh Vidhan Parishad in 1970. He was elected to the 5th Lok Sabha in 1971 from Shahjahanpur constituency. He was re-elected to the Lok Sabha in 1980 and 1984 from the same constituency. He was a member of the Rajya Sabha from 1994 to 1999. He was again elected to the 13th Lok Sabha in 1999 from Shahjahanpur constituency.

Posts held
President, Uttar Pradesh Congress Committee since 5 January 1995
Vice-President, AICC, June, 1997 to April, 1998
Chairman, Co-operative Bank, Shahjahanpur
Vice-Chairman, Jawaharlal Nehru Centenary Celebration Committee
Cabinet Secretariat; General Secretary, AICC, 1985
Political Secretary to Rajiv Gandhi, (Congress President)
Political Secretary to P.V. Narasimha Rao, (Congress President)
Member, Indian delegation to the United Nations General Assembly, 1983
Member, Congress Working Committee, 1992 and 1997
Member, Estimates Committee, 1980–82
Member, Committee of Privileges, 1994–96
Member, Committee on Home Affairs, 1995–97
Member, Committee on Commerce
Member, Committee on Public Undertakings
Member, Consultative Committee for the Ministry of Commerce

Notes

External links
 Biographical sketch from Parliament of India records

1938 births
2001 deaths
People from Shahjahanpur
Sam Higginbottom University of Agriculture, Technology and Sciences alumni
Indian National Congress politicians
India MPs 1971–1977
India MPs 1980–1984
India MPs 1984–1989
India MPs 1999–2004
Rajya Sabha members from Uttar Pradesh
Uttar Pradesh MLAs 1969–1974
Lok Sabha members from Uttar Pradesh
Members of the Uttar Pradesh Legislative Council
Indian National Congress politicians from Uttar Pradesh